Micou Point is a point  north-east of Cape Royds on the west side of Ross Island, Antarctica. The point constitutes the north end of Maumee Bight in Wohlschlag Bay. It was named by the Advisory Committee on Antarctic Names in 1993 for air crewman Benjamin Micou, US Navy, who lost his life in a helicopter accident near this point on 13 October 1992.

References

Headlands of Ross Island